Alex Coles may refer to:
 Alex Coles (art critic)
 Alex Coles (rugby union)